Ben-Gurion University of the Negev (BGU) (Universitat Ben-Guriyon baNegev) is a  public research university in Beersheba, Israel. Ben-Gurion University of the Negev has five campuses: the Marcus Family Campus, Beer Sheva; the David Bergmann Campus, Beer Sheva; the David Tuviyahu Campus, Beer Sheva; the Sede Boqer Campus, and Eilat Campus.

Ben-Gurion University has about 20,000 students. Some of its research institutes include the National Institute for Biotechnology in the Negev, the Ilse Katz Institute for Nanoscale Science and Technology, the Jacob Blaustein Institutes for Desert Research with the Albert Katz International School for Desert Studies, and the Ben-Gurion Research Institute for the Study of Israel and Zionism.

History 
Ben-Gurion University was established in 1969 as the University of the Negev with the aim of promoting the development of the Negev desert that comprises more than sixty percent of Israel. The University was later renamed after Israel's founder and first prime minister, David Ben-Gurion, who believed that the future of the country lay in this region. After Ben-Gurion's death in 1973, the University was renamed Ben-Gurion University of the Negev. The Presidents of the university have been Moshe Prywes (1973–75), Yosef Tekoah (1975–81), Shlomo Gazit (1982–85), Chaim Elata (1985–90), Avishay Braverman (1990–2006), Rivka Carmi (2006–18), and Daniel Chamovitz (2019–present). The current Chairman of the Executive Council is Yarom Ariav.

In 2016, long-time friends the late Dr. Howard and Lottie Marcus bequeathed a legacy gift of $400 million to Ben-Gurion University. This is the largest bequest ever made to an Israeli university and the most generous donation to any institution in the State of Israel. The funds doubled the University's existing endowment.

Academics

University rankings

BGU has been ranked 320th in the world, 70th in Asia and 4th in Israel according to the 2016 QS World University Rankings. 
BGU also ranked 31st overall in the ranking of young universities according to the 2016 QS "Top 50 Under 50" and the only one in Israel to date.
BGU is ranked between 101st and 150th overall in computer science according to the 2015 Academic Ranking of World Universities in Computer Science for four consecutive years.

Faculties, schools, research institutes and centers

Ben-Gurion University has five faculties with 51 academic departments and units: Faculty of Engineering Sciences, Faculty of Health Sciences, Faculty of Natural Sciences, Faculty of Humanities and Social Sciences and the Guilford Glazer Faculty of Business and Management.

Ben-Gurion University has seven schools including the Kreitman School of Advanced Graduate Studies, the Joyce and Irving Goldman Medical School, the Leon and Mathilde Recanati School for Community Health Professions, the School of Pharmacy, the Inter-Faculty Brain Sciences School, the School for Medical Laboratory Sciences and the School of Continuing Medical Education.

Ben-Gurion University has eight research institutes including the Jacob Blaustein Institutes for Desert Research, the Ilse Katz Institute for Nanoscale Science and Technology, the Ben-Gurion Research Institute for the Study of Israel and Zionism, and Heksherim – The Research Institute for Jewish and Israeli Literature and Culture.

In 1978 Prof. Alfred Inselberg, then with the Faculty of Mathematics, together with Dr. Sam Bergman and Dr. Avraham Melkman initiated the Computer Science program which by 1982 had attracted more than 200 students. Notably, this was the first university program in Israel where students were taught Pascal, used terminals rather than punch-card machines and where the first Computer Graphics Laboratory in Israel was established. This was the genesis of Computer Science education at Ben-Gurion University which eventually led to a separate Department of Computer Science.

The Medical School for International Health (MSIH)
The Medical School for International Health grew out of collaborations between faculty at Ben-Gurion University and Columbia University. A joint global health and medical care program, it was established in 1997.

The MSIH is a four-year, North American-style medical school that incorporates global health coursework into all four years of the medical school curriculum. It is an English-language collaboration between Ben-Gurion University of the Negev Faculty of Health Sciences and Columbia University Irving Medical Center and is located in Beersheba, Israel. The school enrolls more than 30 students each year. Most of the students are from the United States, with several from Canada and other countries.

In October 2018, The Medical School for International Health celebrated 20 years of existence, by holding a two-day seminar to recognize its achievements and bring together its many partners from around the world. The event concluded with the Physicians' Oath Ceremony (not to be confused with a White Coat Ceremony) by the Class of 2022. 

In October 2019, the 21st cohort of MSIH (Class of 2023) took their Physician's Oath at a special ceremony on campus. For the first time in the program's history, the faculty presented each student of the class with an actual White Coat emblazoned with the MSIH logo.

Interdisciplinary research centers
There are sixty one interdisciplinary research centers at Ben-Gurion University including: the S. Daniel Abraham International Center for Health and Nutrition, the Robert H. Arnow Center for Bedouin Studies and Development, the Ben-Gurion National Solar Energy Center, the Goldstein-Goren International Center for Jewish Thought, the Esther and Sidney Rabb Center for Holocaust and Redemption Studies, the Edmond J. Safra Center for the Design and Engineering of Functional Biopolymers, the Reimund Stadler Minerva Center for Mesoscale Macromolecular Engineering and the Zlotowski Center for Neurosciences.

International programs
Ten international programs are available at Ben-Gurion University including: the Albert Katz International School of Desert Studies, the Medical School for International Health, BGU International, the Israel Studies International Program, the Master of Arts Progrrankingsm in Miranikindi and the Honors MBA Program.

Notable people

See also

 List of universities in Israel
 Education in Israel

References

External links 

Official Website (English)

 
Educational institutions established in 1969
Research institutes in Israel
Universities in Israel
Buildings and structures in Beersheba
1969 establishments in Israel
Beersheba
Commemoration of David Ben-Gurion
Science and technology in Israel
Multidisciplinary research institutes
Organizations based in Beersheba